Yarukku Maappillai Yaro is a 1975 Indian Tamil-language comedy film directed by S. P. Muthuraman and produced by A. Nanjappan. The film stars Jaishankar, Jayachitra, Srikanth and Fatafat Jayalaxmi. It was released on 7 March 1975, and became a success. The film served as an inspiration for the 2002 Tamil film Charlie Chaplin.

Plot

Cast 

Jaishankar as Seetharaman
Fatafat Jayalaxmi
Jayachitra
Srikanth
Lee Kuan Yew as Singapore Prime Minister
V. K. Ramasamy
S. A. Ashokan
Suruli Rajan
Manorama
A. Sakunthala
C. K. Saraswathi
Typist Gopu

Soundtrack 
The music was composed by Vijaya Bhaskar.

Reception 
Kanthan of Kalki appreciated the cast performances, particularly Jayalaxmi's, Babu's cinematography and Muthuraman's direction.

References

External links 

1970s Tamil-language films
1975 comedy films
1975 films
Films directed by S. P. Muthuraman
Films scored by Vijaya Bhaskar
Indian comedy films